Jason Thompson (born 13 November 1989) is a British former competitive figure skater in men's singles. He is the 2012 British national champion and finished 25th at the 2012 European Championships.

Programs

Competitive highlights 
JGP: Junior Grand Prix

References

External links
 

British male single skaters
1989 births
Living people
Sportspeople from Mansfield